Leons Līdums (born 1957) is a Latvian politician. He was a Deputy of the 9th Saeima and is a member of the People's Party.

References

Deputies of the Saeima
1957 births
Living people
People's Party (Latvia) politicians
21st-century Latvian politicians
Date of birth missing (living people)
Place of birth missing (living people)